Thalissa Nuttall-Teixeira (born 1992/1993) is a British-Brazilian actress and filmmaker. She began her career in theatre, earning an Ian Charleson Award nomination, before breaking out in the miniseries Trigonometry. She was named a 2021 Screen International Star of Tomorrow.

Early life
Teixeira was born in Bradford, West Yorkshire to an English mother and a Baiano father. She spent her childhood in Vitória, Espírito Santo before returning to England with her mother at the age of 8 to live in Chalfont St Peter, Buckinghamshire. She joined a local theatre group at the back of a church. She went onto train at the Royal Welsh College of Music & Drama, graduating in 2014.

Filmography

Film

Television

Stage

Awards and nominations

Audio
 Doctor Who: Into the Stars "Break the Ice. Dr. Lenni Fisk
 In Flux – BBC Radio 3
 Electra – BBC Radio 4

References

External links

Living people
Actresses from Bradford
Actresses from Buckinghamshire
Alumni of the Royal Welsh College of Music & Drama
Black British actresses
British actors of Latin American descent
English expatriates in Brazil
English people of Brazilian descent
People from Chalfont St Peter
People from Vitória, Espírito Santo
Year of birth missing (living people)